Prolita is a genus of moths  belonging to the family Gelechiidae.

Species
Prolita barnesiella (Busck, 1903)
Prolita deoia (Hodges, 1966)
Prolita dialis (Hodges, 1966)
Prolita geniata (Hodges, 1966)
Prolita incicur (Hodges, 1966)
Prolita invariabilis (Kearfott, 1908)
Prolita jubata (Hodges, 1966)
Prolita maenadis (Hodges, 1966)
Prolita nefrens (Hodges, 1966)
Prolita obnubila (Hodges, 1966)
Prolita pagella (Hodges, 1966)
Prolita princeps (Busck, 1910)
Prolita puertella (Busck, 1916)
Prolita recens (Hodges, 1966)
Prolita rectistrigella (Barnes & Busck, 1920)
Prolita sexpunctella (Fabricius, 1794)
Prolita sironae (Hodges, 1966)
Prolita solutella (Zeller, 1839)
Prolita texanella (Chambers, 1880)
Prolita thaliae (Hodges, 1966)
Prolita variabilis (Busck, 1903)
Prolita veledae (Hodges, 1966)

References

 
Gelechiini